Warsaw, also known as Jamestown, is an unincorporated community  in Sumter County, Alabama, United States.

History
The community was originally called Jamestown, in honor of Jamestown, Virginia. The name was then changed to Warsaw, likely in honor of Warsaw, Virginia, where some of the earlier settlers of the area arrived from. Warsaw was incorporated by the Alabama Legislature in February 1839. A post office operated under the name Jamestown from 1832 to 1842, and under the name Warsaw from 1842 to 1910. Since the community was unincorporated in 1910, Warsaw kept its name the same. Warsaw is also one of the oldest communities in Sumter county having incorporated in early February 1839.

References

Unincorporated communities in Alabama
Unincorporated communities in Sumter County, Alabama